Caucasian Sketches, Suite No. 2, Op. 42 (Russian: Кавказские эскизы, Сюита №2, «Иверия») is an orchestral suite by Russian composer Mikhail Ippolitov-Ivanov written in 1896, after he moved to Moscow. The work is more commonly known by the subtitle Iveria, which is an archaic name for the country of Georgia, the folk music of which inspired the composition.

Composition 

After being a student of Nikolai Rimsky-Korsakov, Ippolitov-Ivanov moved to Tbilisi, where he tried to become the director of its conservatory and its orchestra. In these years, he composed both Suite No. 1, in 1894, and Suite No. 2, in 1896. This suite, as Suite No. 1 did, also presents re-used material from Georgian folk songs. Notably, the Berceuse (meaning lullaby in French) is based on the traditional Georgian lullaby Iavnana.

Structure 

The suite contains an introduction and four sketches. A typical performance of this work would last 20–25 minutes:

 I. Introduction: Lamentation of Princess Ketevana. Largo - L'istesso tempo - Largo
 II. Berceuse. Allegretto
 III. Lezghinka. Larghetto - Allegretto - Allegro - Allegro vivo - Presto
 IV. Georgian March. Allegro marziale

The Lezghinka had also been used in Glinka's Ruslan and Lyudmila; it is a typical dance from Lezghy tribes with oriental themes. The piece culminates in a war-march-style finale.

Notable recordings 

Notable recordings of this suite include:

See also 

Caucasian Sketches
Caucasian Sketches, Suite No. 1

References

External links
 Sheets hosted at the University of Rochester

Compositions by Mikhail Ippolitov-Ivanov
Compositions for symphony orchestra
Orchestral suites
1894 compositions